Ivan Lendl was the last champion of the tournament in 1994, but retired from professional tennis at the same year. The 1995 final was suspended due to rain.

Sjeng Schalken won the title by defeating Marcelo Ríos 7–5, 6–3 in the final.

Seeds

Draw

Finals

Top half

Bottom half

References

External links
 Official results archive (ATP)
 Official results archive (ITF)

1997 Singles
MFS Pro Tennis Championships,Singles
MFS Pro Tennis Championships,Singles